The Constitution Act, R.S.B.C. 1996, chapter 66 is a revised provincial Act by the British Columbia legislature. The Act outlines the powers and rules governing the executive and legislative branches of the provincial government of British Columbia. British Columbia is the only province of Canada to have such an act.

Prior to its enactment, the powers and rules of the British Columbia executive and legislature were derived from the British Columbia Terms of Union, which officially joined British Columbia into Canada. Those terms of union, in turn, continued the government established in the terms of union between the Colony of Vancouver Island with the Colony of British Columbia. The British Columbia Terms of Union is still part of the Constitution of Canada, and so the Constitution Act, 1996 can not conflict with it.

Unlike the Constitution of Canada, the British Columbia Constitution is a regular Act of the legislature and can be amended by a normal majority vote. However, any changes that would require an amendment to the British Columbia Terms of Union must be done with the consent of the Government of Canada under the section 43 amending formula.

External links
 Text of BC Constitution Act, 1996
 Text of Canada's Constitution Acts 1867-1982

British Columbia provincial legislation
British Columbia
1996 in Canadian law
1996 in British Columbia